The 2006–07 Idaho Vandals men's basketball team represented the University of Idaho during the 2006–07 NCAA Division I men's basketball season. Members of the Western Athletic Conference (WAC), the Vandals were led by first-year head coach George Pfeifer and played their home games on campus at Cowan Spectrum in Moscow, Idaho.

Riding a twelve-game losing streak after a loss to San Jose State, Idaho drew the eighth seed Spartans again two days later in the play-in round of the conference tournament in Las Cruces, New Mexico, and won by  Two days later in the quarterfinal, top-seeded #10 Nevada defeated the Vandals by 32 points.

Postseason result

|-
!colspan=5 style=| WAC Tournament

References

External links
Sports Reference – Idaho Vandals: 2006–07 basketball season
Idaho Argonaut – student newspaper – 2007 editions

Idaho Vandals men's basketball seasons
Idaho
Idaho Vandals men's basketball team
Idaho Vandals men's basketball team